Paul Geddes is a British businessman, the chief executive (CEO) of QA since September 2019.

Geddes earned a PPE degree from the University of Oxford.

He was the chief executive (CEO) of Direct Line Insurance Group, a FTSE 250 company, until May 2019. He was succeeded as CEO of Direct Line by Penny James.

Geddes is a non-executive director of Channel Four Television Corporation.

References

21st-century English businesspeople
Alumni of the University of Oxford
Channel 4 people
Direct Line Group
English chief executives
Living people
Year of birth missing (living people)